Playing by Heart is a 1998 American comedy-drama film, which tells the story of several seemingly unconnected characters. It was entered into the 49th Berlin International Film Festival. It stars Gillian Anderson, Ellen Burstyn, Sean Connery, Anthony Edwards, Angelina Jolie, Jay Mohr, Ryan Phillippe, Dennis Quaid, Gena Rowlands, Jon Stewart and Madeleine Stowe. Playing by Heart is an ensemble work that explores the path of love in its characters’ lives.

Plot
In Los Angeles, the lives of intertwining characters are shown. Among the characters are an older couple, who are about to renew their wedding vows; a theatre director and architect navigating a new beginning; a young woman looking for a good time; a gay man dying of AIDS and his mother who had not been close; a couple having an affair and her husband who is exploring ways to break through the staleness of their marriage.

As the stories evolve, the connections between the characters become evident.

Hugh is an unhappily married man who regularly hits on other women with an array of lies, one being that he killed his wife and son in a car accident. Another is that on the same day he's fired, his wife and kids left him. In a bar with a drag queen show, he tells one he'd cheated on his wife with his brother. With Valery from his improv class, Hugh runs into in a bar and tells her he does improv better in his life than in class. 

Hannah and Paul are planning their 40th anniversary party and renew their vows, although he's got a brain tumor. She keeps wanting to address he's dying but he's determined not to. Hannah thinks she should stop her televised cooking show, but he won't let her. When she confronts Paul over a picture of another woman in his desk, he admits he never slept with her because he was in love with her.  

Lonely theatre director Meredith dates architect Trent. They go to dinner, and later for a walk. He still wears his wedding ring although is four years divorced. She's also divorced, but also scalded many times. He talks her into making them dinner, but once there she first tells him they will not be having sex, then asks him to leave. She says it's to avoid the inevitable heartache. He gets a do-ove, and they connect at his place.

Gracie meets her lover Roger in hotel rooms, then goes home to distant Hugh. Roger would like nothing more to allow their sex develop beyond the purely, but she firmly stands her ground. Roger is seeing her because his life has always lacked spontaneity, Gracie because the spark has gone out. 

Mark is gravely ill with AIDS and being looked after by his mother Mildred after years of little contact. Estranged for years, with his diagnosis is how she learns he is gay. He asks her to recite Goodnight Moon to him as he drifts off. 

20s clubber Joan flirts with Keenan after having a very vocal definitive breakup with her ex on the phone. Over drinks, she goes on and on about how terrible her relationship was then tries to get a date with him, but he gives her the cold shoulder. Even though Keenan says he doesn't date, he turns up at the movies as Joan proposes. Afterwards, she gets a friend to stage her getting her car stolen so he accompanies her home, but he quickly ducks out. Joan and Keenan admit their feelings, but he admits the love of his life died from sharing needles. Even so, promising to be careful, they start a relationship. 

Mildred calls Meredith for Mark's funeral, as he was the high school sweetheart, then husband, who had left her for a man. Returning home with Mildred, Meredith goes next door to her parents', Hannah and Paul's, where the anniversary preparations are well on their way. Sister Gracie appears to help, and little sister Joan breezes in at the last moment. 

Roger officiates the ceremony, and we see all three sisters on the dance floor with their men and their parents, even Gracie and Hugh seem to have reconciled.

Cast

Production
According to director Willard Carroll the film was made on a budget of $14 million as the cast led by Sean Connery agreed to work for $50,000 each. Carroll praised Connery, saying he "continued his total democratic cooperation in the ensemble piece. He was the most generous actor, although he's a larger-than-life star" and that Connery "set the example" the others followed.

In some regions, the film was released under the title Intermedia and the Region 1 DVD begins with this title. The original US title was Dancing About Architecture, a reference to a line in the film (based on a quote regarding "writing about music") that the idea of "talking about love" is equivalent to "dancing about architecture". A second working title, If Only They Knew, made it as far as the top label for some copies of the soundtrack CD. Executive producers include Bob Weinstein and Harvey Weinstein for Miramax Films.

Jon Stewart's character is an architect, his home in the film is the Stahl House.

The soundtrack includes songs by Morcheeba, Bonnie Raitt, Bran Van 3000, Edward Kowalczyk of Live, Neneh Cherry and Moby.

Reception

The film was released in the United States on December 18, 1998. In the United Kingdom, it was released on August 6, 1999, and opened at the number 11 spot.

On Rotten Tomatoes, the film has an approval rating of 60% based on reviews from 53 critics, with an average rating of 6/10. The site's consensus was: "It's overly talky, but Playing by Heart benefits from witty insights into modern relationships and strong performances from an esteemed cast." On Metacritic, the film has a score of 55% based on reviews from 26 critics, indicating "mixed or average reviews". Audiences surveyed by CinemaScore gave the film an average grade of B+ on an A+ to F scale.

Roger Ebert gave it a thumbs down, and 2.5 out of 4 in his print review, due to its entertaining dialogue, star power and charming moments, but determines it to be a 'near miss' because of its soft, gooey center. It was one of the last films reviewed on air, by film critic Gene Siskel, on Siskel and Ebert at the Movies, before his death on February 20, 1999. Like Ebert, Siskel gave it a thumbs down, deeming the film more about behaviour than story.

Jolie won an award for "Best Breakthrough Performance by an Actress" from the National Board of Review of Motion Pictures, and writer/director Willard Carroll was nominated for an award at the Berlin International Film Festival.

References

External links

  Playing by Heart Trailer, YouTube, 2013
 
 
 
 

1998 films
1990s English-language films
1998 comedy-drama films
Films directed by Willard Carroll
Films scored by John Barry (composer)
Films scored by Christopher Young
American comedy-drama films
Hyperlink films
Hyperion Pictures films
Miramax films
Films with screenplays by Willard Carroll
Films set in Los Angeles
Films shot in Los Angeles
HIV/AIDS in American films
LGBT-related comedy-drama films
1990s American films